Jasson Ramos Carpio (born June 13, 1993) is a professional Guatemalan footballer who plays as a midfielder.

References

External links 
 

1993 births
Living people
Guatemalan footballers
Guatemalan expatriate footballers
FC Tulsa players
Association football midfielders
Expatriate soccer players in the United States
USL Championship players